Bulmer was a Victorian historian, surveyor, cartographer and compiler of directories. His directories provided a history and geography of a particular area. The directories listed and described all parishes; listed trades and professions and provided a helpful street index with the names of residents, together with other local information. Data CDs of Bulmer Directories are available from publishers in the UK.

List of directories
 Bulmer's History, Topography and Directory of East Cumberland, 1883
 Bulmer's History, Topography and Directory of West Cumberland, 1884.
 Bulmer's History, Directory and Topography of Westmorland, 1885
 Bulmer's History, Topography and Directory of Northumberland (Hexham Division), 1886
 Bulmer's History, Topography and Directory of Northumberland (Tyneside, Wansbeck and Berwick Divisions), 1887
 Bulmer's History, and Directory of Newcastle upon Tyne, 1887
 Bulmer's History, and Directory of North Yorkshire, 1890 (two Volumes)
 Bulmer's History, Topography and Directory of East Yorkshire and Hull, 1892
 Bulmer's Directory of Cumberland, 1901
 T. Bulmer: History, Topography and Directory of Westmorland, 1906
 T Bulmer: History, Topography and Directory of Furness and Cartmel, 1911
 Bulmer's History, Topography and Directory of Furness, Cartmel and Egremont division of Cumbria, 1911
 T Bulmer: History, Topography and Directory of Lancaster and district, 1912
 J Bulmer: History, Topography and Directory of Lancaster and district, 1913

References 

Directories